Nataliya Naranovich (born 1 August 1981) is a Belarusian gymnast. She competed at the 2000 Summer Olympics.

References

External links
 

1981 births
Living people
Belarusian female artistic gymnasts
Olympic gymnasts of Belarus
Gymnasts at the 2000 Summer Olympics
Gymnasts from Minsk